Thrimby is a former civil parish, now in the parish of Little Strickland, in the Eden District, Cumbria, England.  It contained five listed buildings that are recorded in the National Heritage List for England. Of these, one is listed at Grade II*, the middle of the three grades, and the others are at Grade II, the lowest grade. The parish was entirely rural, and the listed buildings consist of farmhouses with associated structures, a house, and a pair of entrance lodges.


Key

Buildings

References

Citations

Sources

Lists of listed buildings in Cumbria
Little Strickland